William McAlpine may refer to:

William J. McAlpine (1812–1890), American civil engineer
Sir William McAlpine, 6th Baronet (1936–2018), British businessman
William McAlpine (tenor) (1922–2004), Scottish tenor
William H. McAlpine (1847-1905) American minister and educator

See also
 McAlpine Locks and Dam, named for William McAlpine, district engineer for the Corps of Louisville, Kentucky